Eusebio Cardoso (15 August 1950 – 14 September 2018) was a Paraguayan long-distance runner. He competed in the marathon at the 1976 Summer Olympics.

References

1950 births
2018 deaths
Athletes (track and field) at the 1976 Summer Olympics
Paraguayan male long-distance runners
Paraguayan male marathon runners
Olympic athletes of Paraguay
Place of birth missing
20th-century Paraguayan people